SS John Gorrie was a Liberty ship built in the United States during World War II. She was named after John Gorrie, an American physician, scientist, inventor of mechanical cooling, and humanitarian.

Construction
John Gorrie was laid down on 29 August 1942, under a Maritime Commission (MARCOM) contract, MC hull 1194, by the St. Johns River Shipbuilding Company, Jacksonville, Florida; she was sponsored by Mrs. Denis J. O'Mahoney, the wife of the general manager of the St. John's River SB Co., she was launched on 27 March 1943.

History
She was allocated to South Atlantic Steamship Company, on 24 May 1943. On 22 September 1948, she was laid up in the, National Defense Reserve Fleet, Astoria, Oregon. On 1 June 1954, she was withdrawn from the fleet to be loaded with grain under the "Grain Program 1954", she returned loaded with grain on 23 June 1954. She was again withdrawn from the fleet on 8 August 1957, to have the grain unloaded, she returned empty on 12 August 1957.
She was sold for scrapping, on 14 August 1967, to Zidell Explorations, Inc., for $54,001. She was removed from the fleet on 31 August 1967.

References

Bibliography

 
 
 
 

 

Liberty ships
Ships built in Jacksonville, Florida
1943 ships
Astoria Reserve Fleet
Astoria Reserve Fleet Grain Program